The 2019 Nigerian House of Representatives elections in Osun State was held on February 23, 2019, to elect members of the House of Representatives to represent Osun State, Nigeria.

Overview

Summary

Results

Ayedaade/Irewole/Isokan 
A total of 12 candidates registered with the Uzo Independent National Electoral Commission to contest in the election. APC candidate Taiwo Oluga won the election, defeating PDP Bukola Adebisi and  10 other party candidates. Oluga received 48.78% of the votes, while Adebisi received 42.27%.

Ayedire/Iwo/Ola-Oluwa 
A total of 13 candidates registered with the Independent National Electoral Commission to contest in the election. APC candidate Yinusa Amobi won the election, defeating PDP Lukman Mudashiru and 11 other candidates. Amobi received 42.82% of the votes, while Mudashiru received 31.66%.

Boluwaduro/Ifedayo/Illa 
A total of 12 candidates registered with the Independent National Electoral Commission to contest in the election. APC candidate Olufemi Fakeye won the election, defeating PDP Clement Akanni and 10 other party candidates. Fakeye received 51.88% of the votes, while Akanni received 43.92%.

Ede North/Ede South/Egbedero/Ejigbo 
A total of 14 candidates registered with the Independent National Electoral Commission to contest in the election. PDD candidate Bamidele Salam won the election, defeating APC Adejare Bello and 12 other candidates. Salam received 46.46% of the votes, while Bello received 44.36%.

Ife Central/Ife East/Ife North/Ife South 
A total of 10 candidates registered with the Independent National Electoral Commission to contest in the election. PDP candidate Taofeek Ajilesoro won the election, defeating APC Folorunso Oladoyin and 8 other candidates. Ajilesoro received 50.43% of the votes, while Oladoyin received 44.28%.

Atakunmosa East/Atakunmosa West/Ilesa East/Ilesa West 
A total of 2 candidates registered with the Independent National Electoral Commission to contest in the election. APC candidate Lawrence Ayeni won the election, defeating PDP Dapo Adelowokan. Ayeni received 57.65% of the votes, while Adelowokan received 42.35%.

Irepodun/Olurunda/Osogbo/Orolu 
A total of 20 candidates registered with the Independent National Electoral Commission to contest in the election. APC candidate Olubukola Oyewo won the election, defeating PDP Morufu Adebayo and 18 other party candidate. Oyewo received 52.45% of the votes, while Adebayo received 46.67%.

Obokon/Oriade 
A total of 13 candidates registered with the Independent National Electoral Commission to contest in the election. PDP candidate Oluwole Oke won the election, defeating APC Olasiji Akanmu and 11 other candidates. Oke received 53.51% of the votes, while Akanmu received 41.67%.

Odo-Otin/Boripe/Ifelodun 
A total of 11 candidates registered with the Independent National Electoral Commission to contest in the election. APC candidate Olalekan Afolabi won the election, defeating PDP Adetunji Olusoji and 9 other candidates. Afolabi received 55.20% of the votes, while Olusoji received 43.47%.

References 

Osun
Osun State elections